Glenn James Gulliver (born October 15, 1954) is an American former Major League Baseball (MLB) third baseman who played for the Baltimore Orioles in 1982 and 1983.

Amateur career
A native of Detroit, Michigan, Gulliver played shortstop on the Eastern Michigan University baseball team that lost to Arizona University in the 1976 College World Series championship game. In 1975, he played collegiate summer baseball with the Orleans Cardinals of the Cape Cod Baseball League and was named a league all-star.

Professional career
He was drafted in the 8th round of the 1976 MLB Draft by the Detroit Tigers, Gulliver made his major league debut for the Baltimore Orioles on July 17, 1982. In all, Gulliver appeared in 73 games as a third baseman for the Orioles from 1982 to 1983.

Gulliver posted a .203 batting average (39-for-192) with 29 runs, 10 doubles, 1 home run, 7 RBI and 46 bases on balls. Defensively, he handled 176 out of 180 total chances at third base for a .978 fielding percentage.

Personal
Gulliver is a high school baseball coach for Allen Park High School in Allen Park, Michigan.

References

External links

1954 births
Living people
Baltimore Orioles players
Baseball players from Detroit
Eastern Michigan Eagles baseball players
Evansville Triplets players
Gold Coast Suns (baseball) players 
Hagerstown Suns players
Louisville Redbirds players
Montgomery Rebels players
Orleans Firebirds players
Richmond Braves players
Rochester Red Wings players
St. Petersburg Pelicans players